Stéphanie Blake (born 1968 in Northfield, Minnesota) is an author of children's stories who lives in Paris.  She had been published by Random House, l'école des loisirs and Gecko Press. 
Her works have been translated from French into English, Spanish, Swedish, Norwegian, Korean, Japanese, Chinese, Māori and Italian.

Books in English
Published by Gecko Press:
2011 – Poo Bum, 32pp., 
2012 – Stupid Baby, 36pp., 
2013 – A Deal's A Deal, 32pp., 
2014 − I Don't Want to Go to School, 28pp., 
2015 – I Want Spaghetti!, 32pp., 
2016 – Super Rabbit, 32pp., 
2017 – I Can't Sleep, 40pp., 
2018 – I'm the Biggest, 32pp., 
2019 – Nits, 32pp.,

Other Publications 
Te reo Māori translation of Poo Bum:

 2019 – Paraweta, (Gecko Press) 32pp., 

Games:

 2016 – Poo Bum Memory Card Game.,

References

American children's writers
1968 births
Living people
American expatriates in France
21st-century American women writers